The Sitting Duck is a 2022 French-language thriller film directed by Jean-Paul Salomé from a screenplay he co-wrote with Fadette Drouard. The film is co-production between France and Germany.

The film is an adaptation of the 2019 book of the same name written by Caroline Michel-Aguirre, an investigative journalist for L'Obs. The book reported on Maureen Kearney, an Irish trade unionist for the nuclear power company Areva. She became a whistleblower when she revealed a secret deal between the state-owned utility Electricité de France and a Chinese power company, which Kearney feared would transfer sensitive nuclear technology from Areva to China and threaten thousands of French jobs. Following her revelations, Kearney was subjected to anonymous threats which culminated in a violent attack in her home in 2012.

The film stars Isabelle Huppert as Kearney. It had its world premiere at the 79th Venice International Film Festival on 2 September 2022.

Synopsis
A thriller investigation set in the world of nuclear power and politics.

Cast

Production
The Sitting Duck was produced by Le Bureau in co-production with France 2 Cinéma, Restons Groupés Productions, Les Films du Camélia and Germany's Heimatfilm.

Release
The Sitting Duck was selected to be screened in the  section at the 79th Venice International Film Festival. It had its world premiere at Venice on 2 September 2022. It was theatrically released in France by Le Pacte on 1 March 2023. It will be theatrically released in Germany by Weltkino Filmverleih on 27 April 2023.

Reception

Critical response
Le Point found the main character irritating: "An elusive, unpredictable, even eccentric woman with her kitsch look, her colorful outfits and her collection of spectacular glasses and earrings".

Reviewing the film following its Venice premiere, Stephanie Bunbury of Deadline wrote, "Huppert, who can convey an ocean of feeling with the twitch of an eyebrow, embodies this unassuming heroism so effectively that you hardly notice that a much bigger story has been allowed to become a blur".

References

External links
 

2022 films
2020s French films
2020s French-language films
2022 thriller films
French thriller films
German thriller films
French-language German films
Films directed by Jean-Paul Salomé
Films scored by Bruno Coulais
France 2 Cinéma films
Thriller films based on actual events
French films based on actual events
German films based on actual events
Films based on non-fiction books